Paisley is an unincorporated community in Greene County, in the U.S. state of Pennsylvania.

History
A post office called Paisley was established in 1887, and remained in operation until it was discontinued in 1917. The community may have been named after a local landowner, or named after Paisley, Scotland.

References

Unincorporated communities in Greene County, Pennsylvania
Unincorporated communities in Pennsylvania